Lane Michael Thomas (born August 23, 1995) is an American professional baseball outfielder for the Washington Nationals of Major League Baseball (MLB). He previously played for the St. Louis Cardinals.

Thomas was drafted by the Toronto Blue Jays in the 2014 Major League Baseball draft out of Bearden High School. He played in their minor league system for four years before he was traded to the Cardinals in 2017. He made his MLB debut with the team in 2019, but struggled with injuries and was unable to find consistent playing time before he was traded to the Nationals during the 2021 season, with whom he became their starting center fielder.

Amateur career
Thomas attended Bearden High School in Knoxville, Tennessee. As a sophomore, he committed to play college baseball at the University of Tennessee. During the summer of 2013, he played for Team USA in the 2013 18U Baseball World Cup in Taichung. In 2014, as a senior, he batted .410 with 17 home runs and 40 RBIs. Following his senior year, he was drafted by the Toronto Blue Jays in the fifth round of the 2014 Major League Baseball draft.

Professional career

Toronto Blue Jays organization
Thomas signed with the Blue Jays for $750,000, forgoing his college commitment.

Thomas made his professional debut that same year with the Gulf Coast League Blue Jays before being reassigned to the Bluefield Blue Jays. In 52 games between the two clubs, he batted .281 with one home run and 19 RBIs. In 2015, he played for both the Vancouver Canadians and the Lansing Lugnuts, hitting a combined .206 with five home runs and 35 RBIs in 52 total games. He spent 2016 with Lansing where he compiled a .216 batting average with seven home runs, 27 RBIs, and 17 stolen bases in 81 games. He began 2017 with the Dunedin Blue Jays.

St. Louis Cardinals

On July 2, 2017, Toronto traded Thomas to the St. Louis Cardinals in exchange for international signing bonus cap space. St. Louis assigned him to the Palm Beach Cardinals, but he played in only nine games due to injury. In 82 total games between Dunedin and Palm Beach, he hit .252 with four home runs and 41 RBIs. Thomas began the 2018 season with the Springfield Cardinals where he was named a Texas League All-Star. He was promoted to the Memphis Redbirds in late July and finished the season there, helping the Redbirds win the 2018 Triple-A National Championship Game. In 132 games between Springfield and Memphis, Thomas slashed .264/.333/.489 with 27 home runs, 88 RBIs, and 17 stolen bases. He was assigned to play for the Surprise Saguaros of the Arizona Fall League after the season.

The Cardinals added Thomas to their 40-man roster after the 2018 season.  He returned to Memphis to begin 2019. On April 17, he was recalled to the major leagues for the first time and he made his major league debut that same day at Miller Park against the Milwaukee Brewers. On April 19, against the New York Mets at Busch Stadium, he hit a home run in his first major league at bat. On August 11, Thomas hit his first ever major league grand slam. On August 30, he was placed on the 10-day injured list after being hit in his right wrist. On September 1, he was transferred to the 60-day injured list, effectively ending his season. Over 44 plate appearances with St. Louis, he hit .316 with four home runs.

Thomas began the 2020 season with St. Louis. On August 9, it was announced he had tested positive for COVID-19. He returned to play in October, and ended the season batting .111 with one home run over 18 games. In 2021, Thomas did not make the Opening Day roster. He split time between Memphis and St. Louis during the 2021 season before being traded.

Washington Nationals
On July 30, 2021, Thomas was traded to the Washington Nationals in exchange for Jon Lester. Thomas was called up in August 2021 and soon became the Nationals' everyday center fielder, supplanting Victor Robles. Over 45 games with Washington, Thomas slashed .270/.364/.489 with seven home runs and 27 RBIs.

On June 3, 2022, Thomas enjoyed his first career three-home run game in a contest against the Cincinnati Reds. In 2022 with the Nationals, he played in 146 games, led the majors in percentage of balls hit softly (23.2%), and batted .241/.301/.404 with 17 home runs, 52 RBIs, and 26 doubles.

On January 13, 2023, Thomas agreed to a one-year, $2.2 million contract with the Nationals, avoiding salary arbitration.

Personal
Thomas co-owns Knox Cabinet Co., a home remodeling business, with his sister alongside another co-owner.

See also
 List of Major League Baseball players with a home run in their first major league at bat

References

External links

1995 births
Living people
American expatriate baseball players in Canada
Baseball players from Knoxville, Tennessee
Bluefield Blue Jays players
Dunedin Blue Jays players
Gulf Coast Blue Jays players
Lansing Lugnuts players
Major League Baseball outfielders
Memphis Redbirds players
Palm Beach Cardinals players
Rochester Red Wings players
Springfield Cardinals players
Surprise Saguaros players
St. Louis Cardinals players
Vancouver Canadians players
Washington Nationals players